Irene Esther Ryan (née Irvine;  September 10, 1909 – November 23, 1997) was an American geologist, aviator, and legislator during Alaska's history as both a United States territory and as a U.S. state. She was a member of the Alaska Territorial House of Representatives and of the Alaska State Senate.  She was instrumental in the creation of the Alaska Oil and Gas Conservation Commission, which helped insure state revenue from oil and gas exploration done by outside entities.

Ryan was involved with the creation of the Anchorage International Airport. She was the first female pilot to solo in the Territory of Alaska, and the first woman to earn a geology degree from New Mexico Institute of Mining and Technology. She was inducted into the Alaska Women's Hall of Fame in 2011.

Background and early life
Irene Esther Irvine was born in Boston, Massachusetts on September 10, 1909. Her parents were Leonard Laukki Irvine and Esther Neiminen Irvine. While working in Texas, she heard stories about Alaska from an aviator uncle based in the territory. Aged 21, she relocated to Anchorage. She began flying lessons at Merrill Field east of Anchorage.

On June 23, 1932, she was certified as the first female aviator in the territory to solo. She briefly left Alaska to study at New Mexico Institute of Mining and Technology, where she earned a Bachelor of Science degree in geology, the first woman to do so at that institution. On February 19, 1938, she married fellow student John Edward "Pat" Ryan. In February 1941, she gave birth to their first child Marcella.  A month later, the couple relocated back to Alaska, where the couple's other daughter Patricia was born.

Career
Her civilian career was largely as a consultant to Alaskan industries tied to her field of expertise.  She was involved with development of the oil and gas exploration in the state,  and the Skagway to Fairbanks pipeline. Ryan was responsible for the design of seventeen airports in Alaska, including Anchorage International Airport.  In 1952 she invested her money in a housing project in Anchorage.

In 1955, Ryan was elected to the Alaska Territorial House of Representatives. In 1959, she became a member of the Alaska State Senate. It was during her years in the legislature when Ryan used her educational and professional background to benefit the welfare of her state. She used her influence to get the Alaska Oil and Gas Conservation Commission created in 1955, insuring the state's revenues from oil and gas exploration by outside entities. Governor William Allen Egan appointed Ryan as  commissioner of the Department of Economic Development for the state of Alaska during his second term.

Death and legacy
Irene E. Ryan died on November 23, 1997, aged 88, and was buried at Angelus Memorial Park in Anchorage. In 2011, she was inducted into the Alaska Women's Hall of Fame.

References

External links
 Irene Ryan at 100 Years of Alaska's Legislature

20th-century American geologists
1909 births
1997 deaths
Democratic Party Alaska state senators
American women geologists
American people of Finnish descent
Aviators from Alaska
Deaths from cancer in Alaska
Engineers from Alaska
Members of the Alaska Territorial Legislature
New Mexico Institute of Mining and Technology alumni
Politicians from Anchorage, Alaska
Politicians from Boston
State cabinet secretaries of Alaska
Women state legislators in Alaska
Women territorial legislators in Alaska
20th-century American politicians
American women aviators
20th-century American women scientists
20th-century American women politicians